Wayne Township is the name of some places in the U.S. state of Pennsylvania:
Wayne Township, Armstrong County, Pennsylvania
Wayne Township, Clinton County, Pennsylvania
Wayne Township, Crawford County, Pennsylvania
Wayne Township, Dauphin County, Pennsylvania
Wayne Township, Erie County, Pennsylvania
Wayne Township, Greene County, Pennsylvania
Wayne Township, Lawrence County, Pennsylvania
Wayne Township, Mifflin County, Pennsylvania
Wayne Township, Schuylkill County, Pennsylvania

Pennsylvania township disambiguation pages